is a Japanese cyclist, who currently rides for UCI Continental team .

Major results

1999
 3rd Time trial, National Road Championships
2000
 8th Tour de Okinawa
2001
 2nd Overall Tour de Hokkaido
 2nd Overall Tour de Korea
 3rd Road race, National Road Championships
 4th Time trial, Asian Road Championships
 7th Overall Tour of Japan
2002
 2nd Time trial, National Road Championships
 2nd Overall Tour de Hokkaido
 5th Tour de Okinawa
2003
 2nd Overall Tour de Hokkaido
2004
 5th Overall Tour of Japan
 9th Tour de Okinawa
 10th Japan Cup Cycle Road Race
2005
 3rd Time trial, National Road Championships
 6th Overall Tour of Japan
2006
 1st Overall Tour de Kumano
 4th Overall Tour of Japan
2007
 3rd Time trial, National Road Championships
 7th Overall Tour of East Java
 7th Overall Tour de Hokkaido
2008
 3rd Time trial, National Road Championships
 7th Overall Tour of East Java
2010
 8th Overall Tour de Hokkaido
 8th Overall Tour of Japan
 8th Overall Tour de Martinique
 9th Overall Tour de Kumano
2011
 6th Overall Tour de Martinique
2013
 9th Overall Tour of East Java

References

External links

1973 births
Living people
Japanese male cyclists
Sportspeople from Osaka
Cyclists at the 1998 Asian Games